The Mighty Underdogs is an American hip hop supergroup from the San Francisco Bay Area. It consists of rappers Gift of Gab and Lateef the Truthspeaker and producer Headnodic.

History
The Mighty Underdogs was formed when Lateef the Truthspeaker, planning to make his own solo album, listened to some of Headnodic-produced tracks, rapped a verse for each, and sent them over to Gift of Gab.

The group released The Prelude EP in March 2008. In 2010, XXL included it on the "100 Essential Rap EPs" list.

Their full-length studio album, Droppin' Science Fiction, was released on Definitive Jux in October 2008. It featured contributions from Chali 2na, DJ Shadow, Lyrics Born, and MF Doom, as well as Mr. Lif, Akrobatik, Tash, Julian Marley, and Damian Marley.

Discography

Studio albums
 Droppin' Science Fiction (2008)

EPs
 The Prelude (2008)

Singles
 "Want You Back" (2008)
 "Science Fiction" (2009)

References

External links
 

Hip hop groups from California
Definitive Jux artists
Quannum Projects artists
Hip hop supergroups
Musical groups from Davis, California